Berlin attack may refer to:

 Bombing of Berlin in World War II (1940–45)
 Battle of Berlin (RAF campaign) (1943–44)
 Battle of Berlin (1945)
 Race to Berlin (1945)
 Battle in Berlin (1945)
 Berlin Blockade (1948–49)
 1982 Berlin restaurant bombing
 Bombing of French consulate in West Berlin (1983)
 West Berlin discotheque bombing (1986)
 Israeli consulate attack in Berlin (1999)
 2016 Berlin truck attack
 2018 Berlin anti-semitic attack